Mutai may refer to:

Mutai (name), a surname of Kalenjin (Kenyan) origin
Mutai, meaning "son of Kimutai"
Kinamutay, subtype of Filipino martial arts (commonly misspelled kino mutai)
 Two separate periods of wars (First Mutai and Second Mutai) which afflicted Kenya during the 19th century